Stalag XIII-C  was a German Army World War II prisoner-of-war camp (Stammlager) built on what had been the training camp at Hammelburg, Lower Franconia, Bavaria, Germany.

Camp history
Hammelburg was a large German Army training camp, set up in 1893. Part of this camp had been used as a POW camp for Allied army personnel in World War I. After 1935 it was a training camp and military training area for the newly reconstituted German Army.

In May 1940 the camp was established in wooden huts at the south end of the training ground. The first prisoners included Belgian, Dutch and French soldiers taken during the Battle of France. In May–June 1941 Yugoslavian, predominantly Serbian prisoners arrived from the Balkans Campaign, and soon after in June–July 1941 Australian and other British Commonwealth soldiers arrived, captured during the Battle of Crete.

In April 1943 Oflag XIII-B was opened nearby, with officers transferred from Oflag XIII-A at Nuremberg.

As was usual for Stalags, many of the prisoners were located in Arbeitslager ("Work camps") on farms or adjacent to factories or other industrial operations. The Stalag served as the base for distribution of International Red Cross packages and mail. A Lazarett (hospital) cared for prisoners that were sick or had been injured in industrial accidents or air-raids. A number of enlisted men and NCOs were housed in the adjacent Oflag to provide necessary services.

American soldiers that had been captured during the Battle of Normandy arrived in June–July 1944, and more from the Battle of the Bulge in January 1945. In March 1945 a large group of prisoners arrived in deplorable condition after marching the 500 miles (800 km) from Stalag VIII-D in severe winter conditions. The camp was liberated by Combat Command B of the U.S. 14th Armored Division on 6 April 1945.

In television 
The 1960s and 1970s American television program Hogan's Heroes was situated in a fictitious POW Camp called "Luft-Stalag 13" located near Hammelburg, likely based on actual Luftwaffe POW camps administered by them for Allied POW combat pilots and aircrew shot down over German territory. However, there was no resemblance to the actual Stalags XIII-A, -B or -C other than name and location.

Footnotes

External links 
 
   Story of Cpl. Furman Grimm
  Brief note on Australian Lawson Rolling
  Story of French prisoner Félix Madouas in French
  Description of Oflag XIII-B and Task Force Baum

World War II prisoner of war camps in Germany